

Studio albums
Aceyalone
 All Balls Don't Bounce (1995)
 A Book of Human Language (1998) (with Mumbles)
 Accepted Eclectic (2001)
 Hip Hop and the World We Live In (2002) (with Elusive)
 Love & Hate (2003)
 Magnificent City (2006) (with RJD2)
 Lightning Strikes (2007) (with Bionik)
 Aceyalone & the Lonely Ones (2009) (with Bionik)
 Leanin' on Slick (2013) (with Bionik)
 Action (2015) (with Bionik)
 Mars (2016) (with Slippers)
 Ancient Future: Conversations With God (2017) (with Orko Eloheim)
 43rd & Excellence (2018) (with Fat Jack)
 Mars, Vol. 02 (2018) (with Slippers & Michelle Stevens)
 Let's Get It (2019)

Freestyle Fellowship (Aceyalone with Myka 9, P.E.A.C.E. & Self Jupiter)
 To Whom It May Concern... (1991)
 Innercity Griots (1993)
 Temptations (2001)
 Shockadoom (2002) [EP]
 The Promise (2011)

Haiku d'Etat (Aceyalone with Abstract Rude and Myka 9)
 Haiku d'Etat (1999)
 Coup de Theatre (2004)

The A-Team (Aceyalone with Abstract Rude)
 Who Framed the A-Team? (1999)
 Lab Down Under (2003)

Other releases
 Version 2.0: To Whom It May Concern... Remixed by J. Sumbi (2001) [remixes of tracks from To Whom It May Concern...]
 The Lost Tapes (2003) [mixtape]
 Grade A (2004) [rarities collection]
 Grand Imperial (2006) [rarities collection]
 Who Reframed the A-Team? (2006) ['best of' compilation by The A-Team]
 Power Plant (2011) [mixtape by Freestyle Fellowship]
 Aceyalone 101 (2013) [rarities collection]
 Action Accessed Remixes (2017) [remixes of tracks from Action]

Singles
 "Mic Check" (1995)
 "The Greatest Show On Earth" (1996)
 "The Guidelines" (1998)
 "Moonlit Skies" (2003)
 "Lost Your Mind" (2003)
 "Fire" (2005)
 "Supahero" (2006)

Guest appearances
 The Nonce - "Bus Stops" from World Ultimate (1995)
 Fat Jack - "Gimme Five Feet" and "Golden Mic" from Cater to the DJ (1999)
 Swollen Members - "Consumption" from Balance (1999)
 Nobody - "Faces of the Deep" from Earthtones EP (1999)
 Mystik Journeymen - "Reflections" from The Black Sands ov Eternia (1999)
 Dilated Peoples - "The Shape of Things to Come" from The Platform (2000)
 Anti-Pop Consortium - "Heatrays" from Tragic Epilogue (2000)
 Self Jupiter - "4808-4911-A" from Hard Hat Area (2001)
 Busdriver - "Jazz Fingers" from Temporary Forever (2002)
 Linkin Park - "Wth>You" from Reanimation (2002)
 2Mex - "3 or 13" and "No Category" from Sweat Lodge Infinite (2003)
 DJ Drez - "Last Show" from The Capture of Sound (2003)
 Zion I - "Cheeba Cheeba" from Deep Water Slang V2.0 (2003)
 Omid - "Live from Tokyo" from Monolith (2003)
 The Grouch & Eligh - "This Is Yo Life" from No More Greener Grasses (2003)
 Wildchild - "Bounce" from Secondary Protocol (2003)
 Abstract Rude - "What Tyme Iz It?" from Showtyme (2003)
 Fat Jack - "Keep Rock'n On" from Cater to the DJ 2 (2004)
 Ellay Khule - "B-Girl Queendom" from Califormula (2005)
 Onry Ozzborn - "What to Do?" from In Between (2005)
 DJ Z-Trip - "Everything Changes" from Shifting Gears (2005)
 Subtitle - "Cray Crazy" from Young Dangerous Heart (2005)
 Thirsty Fish - "Fall Apart" from Testing the Waters (2007)
 Myka 9 - "Options" from 1969 (2009)
 Himself - "Social Drinker" from Feel Like a Star (2011)
 Luckyiam - "For You" from I Love Haters (2011)
 Myka 9 - "Oh Yeah... Alright" from Mykology (2012)
 Abstract Rude - "The Media" from Dear Abbey (2012)
 Abstract Rude - "For tha Luv" from Keep the Feel: A Legacy of Hip Hop Soul (2015)
 RJD2 - “A Genuine Gentleman“ from The Fun Ones (2020)

Compilation appearances
 "Jurassick", "I Think", "Maskaraid", and "Treble and Bass" on Project Blowed (1995)
 "Project Bliznaiznowed" on The Funky Precedent (1999)
 "Future Rockers" on Tags of the Times 3 (2001)
 "Do the Math", "Give It Here", and "Superstars" on Project Blowed Presents the Good Brothers (2003)
 "Doin' My Job" on 2K6: The Tracks (2005)
 "Enter the Kaos", "Do Unto Others", and "Ruff Rhymes" on Project Blowed 10th Anniversary (2005)
 "Let's Go Get It", "Borderline", and "Krazy World" on Calicomm 2004 (2005)
 "Champions" on Dan the Automator Presents 2K7 (2006)

Video game appearances 

 "Cold Piece" on the main menu of the 2019 video game Trials Rising.

 “Rappers On Deck” was featured in the soundtrack of the 2003 game Tony Hawk’s Underground

Discographies of American artists
Hip hop discographies